Hunt  is a 2023 Indian Telugu-language action thriller film directed by Mahesh Surapaneni. It stars Sudheer Babu, Srikanth, Bharath. Produced by B. Madhu under Bhavya Creations Division banner and based on multiple true incidents that took place in the states of Andhra Pradesh and Telangana. The film features music scored by Ghibran, with cinematography by Arul Vincent, and editing by Praveen Pudi.
It is a remake of the 2013 Malayalam movie Mumbai Police.

Plot
P. Arjun Prasad is the ACP of Hyderabad, who gets involved in an accident which leads him to suffer partial memory loss. Before the accident, Arjun was having a conversation with Commissioner of Police Mohan Bhargav. He informs Mohan that he has solved the murder case of his best friend ACP Aryan Dev who was killed with a sniper during a gallantry awards ceremony at the police parade ground, but before disclosing the name of the murderer, the accident occurs resulting in the partial memory loss. Arjun is attacked by assassins at his apartment after he gets discharged, but he fights them off.

Mohan tells Arjun about their relationship with Aryan and the case investigations that Arjun has made. The trio were nicknamed as Mumbai Police due to their past in the Mumbai counter terrorism division. Arjun's capabilities as a cop being impressive, Mohan reassigns Arjun back on the case despite the memory loss. Arjun has a hard time adjusting to his new life which starts affecting his profession. As the investigations continues, Arjun realizes that he was daredevil cop with an impressive record but was notorious for his use of violence, alcoholism and womanizing.

Arjun finds that the sniper that was used to assassinate Aryan was remote controlled. As his investigation deteriorates, Arjun is asked to be removed from the case by his team members but Arjun asks for 2 days time in order to solve the case and find the culprit. A man comes to Arjun's apartment and starts behaving oddly, which confuses Arjun and beats him out of his apartment. Arjun realizes that he is a closeted homosexual and breaks down in tears. Arjun confronts Mohan and asks him to reveal the full audio clip on his voicemail that he send before his accident.

Before the accident, Arjun met Aryan's fiancée Nivetha, who showed Aryan's award speech rehearsal video in which he dedicated the award to Arjun. It is then revealed that Arjun himself was the one who killed Aryan since he found about his homosexuality and felt he might oust Arjun. After seeing the video and breaking down, Arjun had confessed to his crimes to Mohan and asks him to arrest him also Mohan tells him that he can use his state of mind and get him out of this case but Arjun tells him that even if he is out he will be living with the guilt that he killed Aryan. The screen cuts Black

Cast 
 Sudheer Babu as P. Arjun Prasad
 Srikanth as Mohan Bhargav
 Bharath as Aryan Dev
 Kabir Duhan Singh as Vikram Singh
 Chitra Shukla as Nivetha
Mime Gopi as Roy
Apsara Rani in an item number in "Papa Tho Pailam"

Music 

The film's first song Papa Tho Pailam  is composed by Ghibran, and lyrics for the songs were written by Kasarla Shyam and sung by Mangli and Nakash Aziz.

Release 
The film was theatrically released on  coinciding with Republic Day.

Reception 
Neeshita Nyayapati of The Times of India rated the film 2.5 out of 5 stars and wrote "Hunt is the kind of investigative thriller that does not depend on the usual hijinks. If you’re looking for something different from the usual fare, this is it".

References

External links
 

2023 action thriller films
2023 LGBT-related films
Indian LGBT-related films
Indian action thriller films
Telugu remakes of Malayalam films
Gay-related films